Tom Söderholm (born 20 December 1953) is a Swedish weightlifter. He competed at the 1984 Summer Olympics and the 1988 Summer Olympics.

References

1953 births
Living people
Swedish male weightlifters
Olympic weightlifters of Sweden
Weightlifters at the 1984 Summer Olympics
Weightlifters at the 1988 Summer Olympics
Sportspeople from Uppsala
20th-century Swedish people